Mouser is an unincorporated community in Texas County, Oklahoma, United States. The community of Straight is two miles to the west. The Beaver, Meade and Englewood Railroad (BM&E) reached the locale in the Summer of 1928, and two grain elevators in Mouser, the Mouser Grain Elevator and the Mouser Woodframe Grain Elevator/Collingwood Elevator, which were built along the BM&E's tracks, are now listed on the National Register of Historic Places listings in Texas County, Oklahoma.

Transportation
Mouser is just off County Road 7, east of Oklahoma State Highway 136 and west of US Route 64.

Guymon Municipal Airport is about 18 miles south-southwest, while commercial air transportation is available out of Liberal Mid-America Regional Airport in Kansas, approximately 33 miles east-northeast.

References

Unincorporated communities in Texas County, Oklahoma
Unincorporated communities in Oklahoma
Oklahoma Panhandle